Lusignan is a commune in the Vienne department in the Nouvelle-Aquitaine region in western France.
It lies 25 km southwest of Poitiers. The inhabitants are called Mélusins and Mélusines.

Geography
The town of Lusignan now has about 3,000 inhabitants. It is located on the road RN11 from Poitiers to La Rochelle. It is about 400 km from Paris. It belongs to the Poitiers arrondissement and the Lusignan canton.

Right north of the town flows the river Vonne, a tributary of the Clain.

History

Between the 10th and 14th centuries, the history of the town fully overlaps with that of the House of Lusignan.

During the 16th century Lusignan is repeatedly involved in the French Wars of Religion between Huguenots and Catholics.

The city walls were dismantled by royal orders in the 17th century.

Population

Monuments
 Château de Lusignan – historical castle of which only very scant remains are left after being long used as a quarry and then fully dismantled in the 18th century

Personalities
 House of Lusignan
 Jacques Babinet – scientist
 André Léo (1824–1900) (real name Léodile Béra) – female writer

Gallery

See also
Communes of the Vienne department
Lazanias

References

External links

 Tourism office

Communes of Vienne
Poitou